Pierre Zentner (born 13 March 1958) is a Swiss lightweight rower. He won a gold medal at the 1978 World Rowing Championships in Copenhagen with the lightweight men's four.

References

1958 births
Living people
Swiss male rowers
World Rowing Championships medalists for Switzerland